

Events

March 
 March 16 – Original Finnish Railway Museum opens in Helsinki.

April 
 April 1 – The Aberlady, Gullane and North Berwick Railway opens between Aberlady Junction and Gullane, Scotland.
 April 20 – Electrification of the South Side Elevated Railway in Chicago is completed ending all steam locomotive operations on the route. Multiple-unit (M.U.) train control is also introduced by railroad engineer Frank J. Sprague.

May 
 May – E. H. Harriman becomes chairman of the executive committee for the Union Pacific Railroad.
 May 11 – The Lynton and Barnstaple Railway in England opens.
 May 16 – Passenger service is inaugurated on the Lynton and Barnstaple Railway.

June 
 June 12 – Regular revenue service begins on the Detroit, Ypsilanti and Ann Arbor Railway in Michigan.

July 
 July 3 – Rail transport in Sudan: Desert railway from Wadi Halfa completed to Atbara by British military engineers on 1,067 mm (3 ft 6 in) gauge.
 July 11 – Opening of the London and South Western Railway’s Waterloo & City line, the second deep-level electrified "tube" railway in London.
 July 21 – First section of White Pass and Yukon Route opens out of Skagway, Alaska, first railroad in the territory.
 July 23 – Brooks Locomotive Works completes its 3,000th new steam locomotive.
 July 30 – The Société des Chemins de fer vicinaux du Mayumbe (CVM) is created to build and operate a network of  gauge railways in the province of Lower Congo, in the Congo Free State, with a planned extension to the Republic of the Congo.

September 
 September 2 – The Wellingborough rail accident in England kills 7 people.

October 
 October 17 – The Wrawby Junction rail crash in England kills 9 people.

Unknown date 
 Sunset magazine is founded as a promotional tool of the Southern Pacific Railroad.
 The Loup Creek & Deepwater railway is officially renamed Deepwater Railway

Births

Deaths 

 March 6 – Hugh J. Jewett, president of the Erie Railroad 1874–1884 (b. 1817).
 October 12 – John M. Forbes, president of the Michigan Central Railroad and the Chicago, Burlington and Quincy Railroad (b. 1813).
 November 20 – Sir John Fowler, British civil engineer (b. 1817).
 December 15 – Calvin S. Brice, president of Lake Erie and Western Railroad, builder of Nickel Plate Road (b. 1845).

References